The 2014–15 season is the 109th season in the Football League and 116th season overall of association football played by Derby County F.C., an English football club based in Derby, Derbyshire. Their third-place finish in the 2013–14 season and losing out to Queens Park Rangers in the play-off final means it is their seventh consecutive season in the Championship, and it is their 47th season overall in the second division of English football. It will be Steve McClaren's first full season as head coach of the team.

Overview
Derby County played their league games in the Championship in the 2014-15 season, the fixtures were announced on 18 June 2014. The season began on 9 August 2014 and concluded on 2 May 2015 For the majority of their league campaign, Derby County were placed around the top positions in the league, being in first place on three separate occasions. However, a collapse in form from March saw them drop from first place to eventually finishing eighth.

Derby entered the League Cup in the first round, the draw for this was announced on 17 June 2014. Derby were in the northern half of the draw and were one of the seeded teams. They were drawn an away tie against non-seeded, League Two side Carlisle United. After defeating Carlisle, Derby went through to the second round of the competition. They were one of the seeded teams in the draw and they were drawn to play Charlton Athletic in the second round. They defeated Charlton Athletic and in the third round faced Reading. Derby progressed through to the fourth round of the competition after defeating Reading, and in the fourth round draw they were given an away tie at another Championship team, which was Fulham. After managing to defeat Fulham away from home, Derby were drawn at home to Premier League club Chelsea in the Quarter Finals. They exited the competition at this stage after a 3–1 home defeat to Chelsea.

Derby entered the FA Cup at the third round stage. The draw for this was made on 8 December 2014, and Derby were drawn to play Conference Premier side Southport at home. After winning their third round tie, they were drawn to play at home to either Chesterfield or Scunthorpe United in the fourth round draw. Their third round fixture had to go to a replay which Chesterfield won, therefore confirming that Derby County's fourth round match was versus fellow Derbyshire side Chesterfield. They made it through to the fifth round, where they were drawn another home tie, playing Championship team Reading. Derby were knocked out of the FA Cup in the fifth round after losing the tie to Reading.

Pre-season

The club's preparations for the season started with the players returning to training on 25 June 2014. Derby County arranged their first four pre-season fixtures against non-league teams and they were announced on 27 May 2014. The club also announced a further pre-season fixture versus League One side Notts County, and another versus League Two club Burton Albion. A behind closed doors friendly against Northampton Town was also arranged, however this replaced the fixture again non-league side Mickleover Sports, which because of this became an under 21s fixture. On 9 June 2014, the club confirmed a friendly against Russian Premier League side Zenit St Petersburg on 22 July, as part of a six-day training camp in Austria. They also confirmed a pre-season friendly against Bosnia and Herzegovina club Slavija Sarajevo on 25 July whilst in Austria. A home friendly, announced on 13 June 2014, against Scottish Championship team Rangers was played at the iPro Stadium on 2 August 2014.

Derby started their pre-season well, winning four and drawing one of their first five friendly matches. However, they faced defeat for the first time when they lost their friendly against Zenit St Petersburg in their first match of their Austria tour. In the match versus Zenit, new signing George Thorne picked up an injury and was substituted in the first half. On 24 July 2014, it was revealed that Thorne suffered an anterior cruciate ligament injury in his left knee, which would see him ruled out for up to nine months. Overall from Derby's nine first team friendlies they won seven, drew one, and lost one.

Derby County retained 21 players from the previous season, these were players still under contract going into the new season. Jamie Ward and John Eustace had one-year extension options on their current contracts which both players used. During the pre-season months, Derby agreed new contracts to several current players. On 25 June 2014, Lee Naylor agreed a new contract, having completed a short-term stay last season. On 26 June 2014, midfielder Jeff Hendrick signed a new four-year contract with Derby to keep him until the end of the 2017-18 season. The following day, Craig Forsyth also signed a new four-year contract with Derby. Defender Jake Buxton signed a new three-year contract on 30 June 2014. On 1 July 2014, Will Hughes followed his teammates by extending his contract as well, with a new four-year deal. On 25 June 2014, Derby County received and immediately rejected, an undisclosed bid from Burnley for 2013-14 player of the year winner Craig Bryson. On 3 July 2014, Bryson confirmed he will be staying at the club by agreeing a new five-year contract, a deal which would see him stay until the summer of 2019. Young forward Mason Bennett became the last player before the season began to commit to a new contract, by agreeing a new four-year deal at the club on 29 July 2014.

In the pre-season transfer window, Derby County brought in several players for the first team and youth teams too. Derby's first deal was announced on 4 June 2014, with young goalkeeper Jonathan Mitchell joining from Newcastle United on a free transfer. With his contract with Newcastle expiring at the end of June, Mitchell officially joined Derby County from 1 July 2014, at the start of the summer transfer window. The second transfer was another free, Kosovan attacking midfielder Alban Bunjaku, who was previously at La Liga club Sevilla, signed for Derby on 10 June 2014. On 25 June 2014, Derby announced that Zak Whitbread agreed a one-year deal to join the club on a permanent basis, he was previously at Derby County for the 2013-14 season on loan. On 1 July 2014, the first day of the transfer window opening, Derby signed Alefe Santos on a free transfer, after he turned down a new contract at his previous club Bristol Rovers. On 10 July 2014, Derby agreed a deal to sign right back Cyrus Christie on a three-year contract. He was out of contract at his previous club Coventry City, however the clubs agreed compensation for him since he came through Coventry's academy and is under 23 years old. The compensation fee was undisclosed. During pre-season, Spanish attacking midfielder and youth international Iván Calero joined Derby on a trial period. Following his trial, on 18 July 2014 he agreed a two-year permanent deal with the club, with an option of a further year. Two bids were made for West Brom midfielder George Thorne, who was at Derby on loan last season, to try and bring him to the club again. Even with the player himself offering a formal transfer request on two occasions, both undisclosed bids were rejected. Weeks after this, on 18 July 2014, Derby County and West Brom agreed a fee for Thorne. The following day, after agreeing personal terms and passing a medical, Thorne joined Derby on a four-year contract. On 1 August 2014, Derby signed forward Shaq McDonald, who had been on trial during pre-season. He agreed a two-year deal. Derby continued to bring in new players in the transfer window, and on 4 August 2014 Leon Best joined on a season-long loan deal from Blackburn Rovers. On 6 August, Derby agreed a deal to bring in Real Madrid midfielder Omar Mascarell on a season-long loan.

Several of Derby's players had come to the end of their contracts in the previous season and were therefore released by the club. The only transfer away from the club after this came on 23 July 2014, when they loaned out under-21s defender Josh Lelan to League One club Swindon Town. The loan deal would see him join Swindon for a month until 23 August.

None of Derby County's under contract players were sold in pre-season, however Derby turned down a bid for right back Kieron Freeman on 16 July 2014. The bid was from Sheffield United, which was one of the clubs he was loaned out to last season.

There was an addition in the ownership of the club on 28 May 2014. The club announced that Derby-born businessman, Mel Morris, had become a new owner and director of Derby County and therefore became a new member of the board of directors. He was previously a director of the club in 2006 and 2007. Morris is also a shareholder in, and non-executive chairman of King, the company behind the highly successful smartphone game Candy Crush Saga. During pre-season, Derby County's academy was improved to try to improve the club's youth development. Following this on 25 July 2014 they achieved category one status, meaning their youth players will compete in the Under 21 Premier League and Under 18 Premier League for the first time. In the final week before the season began, Steve McClaren, Paul Simpson and Eric Steele all agreed new contracts which run until summer 2017.

August

During August, Derby County played seven fixtures including five League games and two in the League Cup. They won both cup games to progress to the third round. In the league they won two, drew two, and lost only one game, giving them a seventh-place position at the end of August.

The club were also involved in the transfer market during the rest of August. On 25 August 2014, Derby County agreed a loan deal to sign defender Ryan Shotton from Stoke City, with a view to a permanent move. On 29 August 2014, Derby brought in another player on loan with Liverpool forward Jordon Ibe joining the club on a season-long loan.

Some players were let out on loan from the club, but no players left Derby permanently during August. On 12 August 2014, Mason Bennett joined League One side Bradford City for a half-season loan. On 15 August 2014, Irish duo Conor Sammon and Mark O'Brien went out on loan to Ipswich Town and Motherwell respectively. Sammon's loan was for the rest of the season, whilst O'Brien was sent out until January. On 29 August 2014, defender Josh Lelan, who was already out on loan, extended his deal at Swindon Town by a further month.

Two players already at the club agreed new contracts. On 14 August 2014, Jamie Ward agreed a new two-year contract at Derby, which would extend his stay at the club until the summer of 2016. On 30 August 2014, Head Coach Steve McClaren revealed that last season's top scorer Chris Martin had agreed a new four-year deal with the club.

September

During September Derby played six competitive fixtures, five in the League and one in the League Cup. They were unbeaten throughout the month, winning four and drawing two games. They finished September fourth in the Championship.

The summer transfer window ended in September. On 1 September 2014, the last day of the summer transfer window, Derby County signed German midfielder Tom Koblenz from Bundesliga club Hoffenheim. He agreed a two-year contract after a successful trial period.

One player left the club out on loan during September. On 18 September 2014, defender Tom Naylor joined League Two club Cambridge United on a month's loan.

Derby County captain Richard Keogh agreed a new three-year contract at the club on 22 September 2014, which would extend his stay at the club until the summer of 2017.

Steve McClaren was one of the four managers nominated for Championship Manager of the Month for September, however Ipswich Town manager Mick McCarthy won the award.

October

Derby County played five fixtures during October, with four in the League and one in the League Cup. In all competitions they won three, drew one, and lost one during October. They ended October in first place in the Championship.

During October, goalkeeper Lee Grant was ruled out of action with an ankle sprain. Following this, on 20 October 2014, England U21s goalkeeper Jack Butland was brought in on a month-long loan from Stoke City as cover for Grant.

On 3 October 2014, defender Kieron Freeman joined League 2 side Mansfield Town on a 93-day emergency loan deal. On 21 October 2014, Norwegian goalkeeper Mats Mørch joined Conference North side Leamington in a loan deal until 31 December 2014.

On 14 October 2014, Mason Bennett was recalled from his loan spell at Bradford City.

November

There were five fixtures for Derby County during November, all of them in the Championship. They won three and lost two, which kept them at the top of the Championship league table at the end of the month.

On 18 November 2014, Derby extended Jack Butland's loan at the club by a further week to remain as cover as first choice goalkeeper.

Lee Grant returned from injury towards the end of November and took his place back as first choice goalkeeper, therefore Jack Butland's loan was ended.

December

Derby County had six fixtures during December. Five in the Championship, and one in the League Cup. They won three, drew one, and lost one in the league. However, they lost their Quarter Final fixture in the League Cup. They ended the calendar year in third place in the Championship.

January

In January, Derby County had four fixtures in the Championship, and two in the FA Cup. They won three and lost one in the league, and won both of their FA Cup matches. At the end of January they were second in the Championship.

The mid-season transfer window opened in January, which saw several players join the club. On 1 January 2015, defender Ryan Shotton agreed a permanent deal with the club after being on loan for the first half of the season. He agreed a -year contract. The following day, striker Darren Bent joined Derby on loan for the rest of the season from Premier League club Aston Villa. After being on trial, Swedish defender Isak Ssewankambo joined Derby County on 12 January 2015, on a two-and-a-half-year deal. On 15 January 2015, left-back Stephen Warnock joined the club for an undisclosed fee from Leeds United. He agreed an 18-month deal with an option of a further year. On 16 January 2015, Spanish centre-back Raúl Albentosa joined Derby County from La Liga club SD Eibar on a -year contract.

There were also players who moved away from Derby County during the January transfer window. Mark O'Brien extended his loan deal at Motherwell on 5 January 2015. His deal was originally a half-season loan, but was extended for the rest of the season. On 9 January 2015, Alefe Santos joined League One club Notts County, on a one-month youth loan deal. Kwame Thomas made a similar move three days later, also moving to Notts County on a one-month youth loan. On 15 January 2015, striker Conor Sammon's loan deal with Ipswich Town was terminated early, and on the same day he joined Rotherham United on loan for the rest of the season. On 23 January 2015, Paul Coutts and Kieron Freeman joined League One club Sheffield United permanently. Coutts joined for an undisclosed fee, whereas Freeman joined for free, after cancelling his contract at Derby by mutual consent. Defender Tom Naylor left the club on loan on 30 January 2015. He joined League Two club Burton Albion for the rest of the season.

Striker Leon Best's loan with Derby was cancelled on 6 January 2015, by activating a clause in his contract. The original loan deal was season-long, however he was sent back to his parent club Blackburn Rovers. On 15 January 2015, Jordon Ibe was recalled by his parent club Liverpool, therefore ending his loan at the club with immediate effect.

On 6 January 2015, Steve Round joined Derby County's coaching staff on a part-time basis. Round had previous spells at the club as a player and coach, and has worked with Head Coach Steve McClaren before as well.

On 7 January 2015, Goalkeeper Lee Grant signed a new contract with the club. He agreed a new deal which will run until 2017.

Derby County manager Steve McClaren was nominated for Championship Manager of the Month for January. However, Middlesbrough manager Aitor Karanka won the award.

February

Derby County played seven fixtures in February; six in the Championship and one in the FA Cup. They won three, drew two, and lost one from their league fixtures. They lost their fixture in the FA Cup and exited the competition in February. At the end of the month they were top of the Championship.

On 2 February 2015, the last day of the mid-season transfer window, Derby County signed winger Tom Ince from Premier League club Hull City, on loan for the rest of the season. On the same day, Iván Calero joined Burton Albion on a one-month youth loan deal. Also on transfer deadline day, midfielder Jesse Lingard signed on loan from Manchester United for the rest of the season.

On loan winger Tom Ince was nominated for Championship Player of the Month for February, however he did not win the award.

March

In March, Derby County had five matches in the Championship. They failed to win any of their fixtures in March, drawing two and losing three. They finished the month fifth in the Championship.

On 7 March 2015, defender Farrend Rawson joined Championship club Rotherham United on a 28-day youth loan.

April

There were six Championship fixtures for Derby County in April. They won two and drew four, and ended the month in sixth position in the Championship.

On loan winger Tom Ince won Championship Player of the Month for April, after scoring five goals in six matches during April.

May

Derby County played their final game of the season in May, which ended in defeat. They ended the season eighth in the Championship.

Transfers
Last updated: 26 March 2015

Note: Flags indicate national team as has been defined under FIFA eligibility rules. Players may hold more than one non-FIFA nationality.

 1 = No transfer fee, but a compensation fee was paid, which was undisclosed.
 2 = Original loan was until 2 May 2015, but Best's loan was ended on 6 January 2015. 
 3 = Original loan was until 2 May 2015, but Shotton joined on a permanent basis on 1 January 2015. 
 4 = Original loan was until 2 May 2015, but Ibe was recalled by Liverpool on 15 January 2015. 
 5 = Original loan was until 17 November 2014, but was extended by a further week. 
 6 = Original loan was until 23 August 2014, but was extended by a further month. 
 7 = Original loan was until 5 January 2015, but Bennett was recalled on 14 October 2014. 
 8 = Original loan was until 2 May 2015, but Sammon's loan was terminated early on 15 January 2015. 
 9 = Original loan was until 31 December 2014, but was extended until the end of the season.

Players

Last updated: 3 February 2015

Note: Flags indicate national team as has been defined under FIFA eligibility rules. Players may hold more than one non-FIFA nationality.

Football Staff
Last updated: 6 January 2015

Kit

Derby County's kit manufacturer for the 2014-15 season is Umbro. This is the first season in a four-year deal after the previous deal with Italian sportswear company Kappa was terminated early. The contract with Kappa was supposed to last until the 2017-18 season, however the club decided to switch to a different kit supplier.

The main shirt sponsor is online takeaway company, JUST EAT, and their logo will be on the front of the Derby County kits. This is the first of a three-year deal to have the company sponsor the kit.

The home kit was revealed on 3 July 2014. The kit's simple design has traditional white top and black shorts, with a black round-neck collar.

The away and third kits were revealed on 8 July 2014. The away shirt is navy, as well as navy shorts and socks. The third kit design is an all yellow shirt, along with royal blue shorts and socks.

Results

Friendlies

Championship

League Cup

FA Cup

Squad statistics

Appearances
Last updated: 10 May 2015

Note: Flags indicate national team as has been defined under FIFA eligibility rules. Players may hold more than one non-FIFA nationality.

|}

Top scorers

Last updated: 10 May 2015

Note: Flags indicate national team as has been defined under FIFA eligibility rules. Players may hold more than one non-FIFA nationality.

Disciplinary record

Last updated: 10 May 2015

Note: Flags indicate national team as has been defined under FIFA eligibility rules. Players may hold more than one non-FIFA nationality.

League table

Club awards

References

External links
 Derby County FC official website

Derby County F.C. seasons
Derby County